Seven Arrows is the debut album by bassist Ben Allison. It was released on the Koch Records label in 1996.

Track listing
All compositions by Ben Allison.

 Dragzilla
 Reflections of Desire
 Delirioso
 Little Boy
 Cosmic Groove Slinky
 Forgetting, For Now
 King of a One Man Planet

Personnel
 Ben Allison – Bass, Guitar
 Ted Nash – Saxophones
 Frank Kimbrough – Piano
 Ron Horton – Trumpet
 Tim Horner – Drums

References

External links
 benallison.com - Seven Arrows

1996 debut albums
Ben Allison albums